Paul Anthony Wilson Wallace (1891–1967) was a Canadian historian and anthropologist who specialized in colonial American history, focusing on Pennsylvania Germans and Native Americans in Pennsylvania.

He was the father of the anthropologist Anthony F. C. Wallace.

Works
 Baptiste Laroque: Legends Of French-Canada, (1923)
 The Twist And Other Stories, (1923)
 Conrad Weiser, 1696-1760: Friend Of Colonist And Mohawk, (1945)
 The White Roots Of Peace, (1946)
 The Muhlenbergs Of Pennsylvania, (1950) 
 Milton S Hershey, (1959) (with Katherine Binney Shippen)
 Indians In Pennsylvania, (1961/81)
 Pennsylvania - Seed Of A Nation, (1962)
 Lloyd Mifflin: Painter And Poet Of The Susquehanna, (1965)
 Indian Paths Of Pennsylvania, (1965)
 Lebanon Valley College: A Centennial History, (1966)
 Daniel Boone In PA, (1967)
 
Source:

Notes

References

 Darnell, Regna. "Keeping the Faith: A Legacy of Native American Ethnography, Ethnohistory, and Psychology."  In: New Perspectives on Native North America: Cultures, Histories, and Representations, ed. by Sergei A. Kan and Pauline Turner Strong, pp. 3–16.  Lincoln: University of Nebraska Press, 2006.

External links
Paul A. W. Wallace papers, Pennsylvania State Archives

Canadian male non-fiction writers
Canadian biographers
Lebanon Valley College faculty
Male biographers
1891 births
1967 deaths
20th-century Canadian historians